The Malá Fatra National Park (Slovak: Národný park Malá Fatra) is a national park in the northern part of the Malá Fatra mountains called Krivánska Malá Fatra.

It has an area of 226.3 km2 (87.37 mi2) and a 232.62 km2 (89.81 mi2) buffer zone. The park was declared in 1988. Between 1967 and 1988 it was a protected landscape area.

For a geological and geographical description see Malá Fatra.

Flora 
The mountain is covered mainly with mixed beech forests, at higher elevations with fir and spruce. Pine woods and meadows occur at higher altitudes. About 83% of the area is covered in forest.

In the variety and beauty of flora species, the following examples stand out as the most remarkable: 
gentian (Gentiana clusii)
auricula (Primula auricula)
Dianthus nitidus
round-leaved sundew (Drosera rotundifolia)
lady's slipper orchid (Cypripedium calceolus)

Fauna 
The fauna includes: 
golden eagle (Aquila chrysaetos)
eagle-owl (Bubo bubo)
black stork (Ciconia nigra)
brown bear (Ursus arctos)
lynx (Lynx lynx)
beech marten (Martes foina)
European otter (Lutra lutra)
wildcat (Felis silvestris)
grey wolf (Canis lupus)

Remarkable places
Kryštálová jaskyňa (Crystal Cave) with calcite decoration, located in the Malý Rozsutec Mountain
the 38 metres high Šútovo Waterfall
castles, such as the Strečno Castle and Starhrad
traditional architecture: Štefanová and Podšíp settlements
Slovak folklore centres, such as the village of Terchová
Jánošíkove diery (trans: Janosik holes) - system of gorges and canyons

See also
Protected areas of Slovakia

External links
Malá Fatra National Park at Slovakia.travel

National parks of Slovakia
Protected areas established in 1988
Protected areas of the Western Carpathians
Tourist attractions in Žilina Region
Geography of Žilina Region